Aventura en África, was the fourth season of the show La Isla de los FamoS.O.S and the sixth season of Survivor to air in Spain and it was broadcast on Antena 3 from January 11, 2005 to March 15, 2005. This season took place in Kenya. This is the first season which introduce anonymous contestants with celebrity contestants. With this season the tribes were initially divided into two tribes, Masai (Celebrity) and Samburu (Anonymous). Following the fifth elimination, the tribes into only one tribe. When it came time for the final five, previously eliminated contestants Mili and Rebeca were voted back in the game by their fellow contestants and next week María Abradelo was chosen to come back by the producers. Ultimately, it was Víctor Janeiro, the well known bullfighter, who won this season over anonymous Raquel Muriel and took home the €60,000 grand prize.

Finishing order

Nominations table 

: The contestants were split in two tribes, Masai and Samburu. Masai tribe won the immunity challenge.
: Samburu tribe won the immunity challenge.
: Masai tribe won the immunity challenge.
: The eviction was cancelled because Olivier before closing the lines, left the game. Mercedes was supposed to be evicted with 71% of the votes but as the eviction was cancelled she wasn't evicted. But as she knew the results, she decided to leave the game.
: José Ramón was exempt from nominations as he is a new contestant.
: Samburu tribe won the immunity challenge.
: Samburu tribe won the immunity challenge.
: The two tribes merged in just one tribe.
: Natalia and Pocholo were exempt from nominations as they are new contestants. 
: Mili and Rebeca re-entered to the game.
: María Abradelo re-entered to the game.
: Víctor won the immunity challenge and because of that he was the first finalist.
: The lines were open to vote for the winner.

External links
http://www.fanmania.net/laselva2005.htm

Survivor Spain seasons